Catumbela Airport  is an airport in Catumbela, a coastal city in the Benguela Province of Angola.

History
After having been expanded and restored, the airport opened in 2012 and due to its capacity and size, would indicate annual passenger movement of around 2.2 million. Cutumbela Airport will form an alternative to the airport in Luanda. The national certification process for Benguela Province's Catumbela airport is expected to be completed in February 2019, providing that the security standards complies with the 'Empresa Nacional de Navegação Aérea' regarding the infrastructure.

Facilities
The airport boasts two boarding bridges and a 3,700-metre runway, 18 migration service-counters and 16 check-in counters. It also provides executive and first class facilities complete with restaurants and bars.

Airlines and destinations

See also
 List of airports in Angola
 Transport in Angola

References

External links 
OurAirports - Catumbela
OpenStreetMap - Catumbela

Airports in Angola
Buildings and structures in Benguela